Vulcanite is a rare copper telluride mineral. The mineral has a metallic luster, and has a green or bronze-yellow tint. It has a hardness between 1 and 2 on the Mohs scale (between talc and gypsum). Its crystal structure is orthorhombic.

Vulcanite is named for the place where it was discovered in 1961, the Mammoth Good Hope Mine in Vulcan (ghost town and district), Gunnison County, Colorado. Small deposits have also been discovered in Japan, Russia, Saudi Arabia, and Norway. It occurs with native tellurium, rickardite, petzite, and sylvanite.

See also
Telluride mineral

References

Telluride minerals
Orthorhombic minerals
Minerals in space group 59
Minerals described in 1961